Parisian Solos is an album by American jazz pianist Jaki Byard consisting of several solo piano recordings. It was recorded in 1971 in Paris, France and was released on the Futura label.

Reception

AllMusic awarded the album 4 stars, with its review by Ken Dryden stating: "This solo date in a Paris studio finds Jaki Byard in his usual jaunty mood at the piano, whether reviving a forgotten jazz tune like "Bugle Call Rag" (before it became a bluegrass standard), increasing the intensity of an often dull ballad "Besame Mucho," or revising "Willow Weep for Me" with the choppy approach that helped to make his sound so distinctive". (The AllMusic review is of the album's re-release edition, which features multiple bonus tracks.)

Track listing
All compositions by Jaki Byard except as indicated.
 "A Tribute to Jimmy Slide" - 3:37  
 "Love Is Here to Stay" (George Gershwin, Ira Gershwin) - 5:15  
 "Willow Weep for Me" (Ann Ronell) - 6:05  
 "Bugle Call Rag" (Billy Meyers, Jack Pettis, Elmer Schoebel) - 4:20  
 "When Lights Are Low" (Benny Carter) - 4:30  
 "Dedicated to Bob Vatel of Ten Gallons" - 3:10  
 "Isle to Isle" - 6:15  
 "Shiny Stockings" (Frank Foster) - 5:35  
 "Bésame Mucho" (Sunny Skylar, Consuelo Velázquez) - 4:15  
 "Going Home Blues" - 5:00

Personnel
Jaki Byard - piano

Notes

References

Jaki Byard albums
1971 albums
Futura Records albums
Instrumental albums
Solo piano jazz albums